The Silver Pencil is a children's novel by Alice Dalgliesh. Based on the author's life, it tells of the childhood and young adulthood of Janet Laidlaw in the early years of the twentieth century. She moves from Trinidad to England, then to the United States and Nova Scotia, Canada, becoming a teacher and a writer. The novel, illustrated by Katherine Milhous, was first published in 1944 and was a Newbery Honor recipient in 1945.

References

1944 American novels
American children's novels
American autobiographical novels
Newbery Honor-winning works
Novels set in Nova Scotia
Novels about writers
1944 children's books